Alison Frantz (27 September 1903 – 1 February 1995) was an archaeological photographer and a Byzantine scholar. With degrees in Classical and Byzantine Studies, she traveled to Greece where she joined the Athenian Agora Excavations. She was the Agora's official photographer from 1939 until 1964 and is especially renowned for her photographs of Greek sculpture. As an archaeologist, she contributed to a better understanding and appreciation of the post-classical layers of the Agora excavations with publications on the Byzantine and Ottoman material.

Education 
Alison Frantz completed her undergraduate degree in Classics at Smith College in 1924 and continued her graduate studies at the Columbia University where she focused on the study of the Byzantine period.

Early career 
Frantz started her career in the Athenian Agora Excavations in 1934, as an assistant of Lucy Talcott in the Record Department. Frantz had been fascinated by photography from a young age, seeing her brother developing photographs in his dark room, and soon she turned to archaeological photography. She started helping Herman Wagner, the official photographer of the Agora and by 1939 she became the official photographer. Just before the Second World War, Frantz was charged with the task to photograph in two days more than six hundred tablets of Linear B, discovered by the famous American archaeologists Carl Blegen in the Mycenaean palace of Pylos. It was largely these photographs that facilitated the decipherment of the Linear B script by Michael Ventris.

The war years (1940–45) 
During the Second World War, Frantz worked closely with the Office of Strategic Services and kept Washington informed about the political and military situation in Greece. After the war, she became a cultural attaché of the United States Embassy in Athens and worked to establish the Fulbright Program in Greece.

Main contribution 
Her main contribution in the field of archaeology and history of the Athenian Agora was that she insisted on a diachronic exploration of archaeological sites. In the case of the Athenian Agora excavations, she focused her interest in recording and studying the post-classical periods, especially Late Antiquity and Byzantium. She was one of the first scholars to publish on the Byzantine and Ottoman collection of finds from the Agora. She also worked closely with John Travlos to restore the Church of the Holy Apostles, the only Byzantine monument still standing today in the Athenian Agora.

As a photographer, Frantz captured with her camera 25 years (1939–64) of discoveries, people and archaeological life in the Athenian Agora. Her talent for archaeological photography was widely recognized and she traveled all around the Mediterranean, photographing archaeological sites and especially Greek sculpture. She is most famous for her photographs of the Parthenon frieze and of the sculptures of the Temple of Zeus at Olympia.

Photographic archive 
The archive of her negatives are kept at the American School of Classical Studies and at Princeton University.

Main publications 
 Athenian Agora vol. XX The Church of the Holy Apostles, Princeton: The American School of classical Studies at Athens, 1971.
 Athenian Agora vol. XXIV Late Antiquity A.D. 267–700, Princeton: The American School of classical Studies at Athens, 1988.

References 

American women photographers
American Byzantinists
American women archaeologists
1903 births
1995 deaths
20th-century American historians
20th-century archaeologists
Smith College alumni
20th-century American women writers
American women historians